It's Nice to Have a Mouse Around the House is a 1965 Warner Bros. Looney Tunes cartoon animated short directed by Friz Freleng. The short was released on January 16, 1965, and stars Daffy Duck, Speedy Gonzales, Sylvester and Granny. The voices were performed by Mel Blanc and Ge Ge Pearson.

Characters
The cartoon marked the first theatrical pairing of Daffy Duck and Speedy Gonzales, with Daffy serving as Speedy's new foe. In addition, Granny is voiced here by Ge Ge Pearson instead of June Foray, who marks her swan song appearance as owner of Sylvester; Granny would make one more appearance in a Warner Bros. cartoon later in 1965.

Plot
Speedy Gonzales invades Granny's home and drives Sylvester to a nervous breakdown. Concerned about the welfare of her cat, Granny calls on the Jet Age Pest Control to remove the rodent. Daffy Duck is assigned the job.

When conventional traps fail, the determined Daffy decides to use a series of contraptions to capture Speedy. However, Speedy is always one step ahead of the duck, and Daffy winds up getting the worst of his machinery.

The final attempt sees Daffy try to program a robot with a card featuring Speedy's picture, but Speedy grabs a Daffy Duck comic book and fools the robot. The robot is seen chasing Daffy out of the house as Speedy watches and remarks to the audience: "It's pretty nice having a mouse around the house, no?"

Succession

See also
List of American films of 1965

References

External links
 

1965 short films
1965 animated films
Looney Tunes shorts
Warner Bros. Cartoons animated short films
DePatie–Freleng Enterprises short films
Films scored by William Lava
1960s Warner Bros. animated short films
1960s English-language films
American animated short films
Films about ducks
Animated films about mice
Daffy Duck films
Speedy Gonzales films
Sylvester the Cat films